Dăncilă may refer to:

Dăncilă, a tributary of the river Jieț in Romania
Viorica Dăncilă, a Romanian politician